Gopinath Bordoloi (6 June 1890 – 5 August 1950) was a politician and Indian independence activist and politician who served as the 1st Chief Minister of Assam from 1946 to 1950.He was also the chairman of North-East Frontier Tribal areas and Assam Excluded and Partially Excluded Areas Sub-Commitee. He was a follower of the Gandhian principle of non-violence as a political tool. Due to his unselfish dedication towards Assam and its people, the then Governor of Assam Jayram Das Doulatram conferred him with the title "Lokpriya" (loved by all).

Early life and education

Gopinath Bordoloi was born on 6 June 1890 at Raha. His father was Buddheswar Bordoloi and mother Praneswari Bordoloi. He lost his mother when he was only 12 years old. He got admitted in Cotton College (then an affiliated college of the University of Calcutta, now a separate autonomous university) after passing matriculation in 1907. He passed I.A. in 1st Div. In 1909 and took admission in the renowned Scottish Church College (also affiliated to the University of Calcutta) and graduated in 1911. He then passed M.A. from the University of Calcutta in 1914. He studied Law for three years but came back to Guwahati without sitting in the final examination. Then on request of Tarun Ram Phukan, he took up the temporary job as Headmaster of Sonaram High School. During that period, he sat and passed in the Law examination and started practicing in 1917 in Guwahati.

Political life
The Assam Association was the only political organisation of Assam in that period. Assam Congress was formed in 1921 as a branch of the Indian National Congress. Gopinath Bordoloi's political life started when he joined the Indian National Congress as a volunteer in that year. He actively participated in the fight for independence. He was arrested in 1922 due to active participation in the Non-co-operation movement and was put in jail for a year. When the movement was called off following the Chauri Chaura incident, he went back to practising law. From 1930 to 1933, he kept himself away from all political activity and got involved in various social works after becoming member of Guwahati Municipal Board and Local Board. In addition, he was constantly demanding a separate University and High Court for Assam.

In 1935 Government of India Act was articulated with a view to form British India. Congress decided to participate in the Regional Assembly election in 1936. They won 38 seats and became the party with majority in Assembly, but due to a dubious law meant to reduce the power of Ministers and the Cabinet, they decided to remain as opposition party instead of forming the government. Gopinath Bordoloi was elected as the leader of the opposition party. With the support of other parties apart from Congress, Md. Sadulla formed the Cabinet of Ministers. The Congress party was gaining people's support as the government remained unaware of the basic problems of Assam. The Md. Sadulla Cabinet Ministers resigned in September 1938. The Governor then invited Gopinath Bordoloi to form the government and accordingly they took oath on 21 September.

The reasons of Gopinath Bordoloi becoming Chief Minister of undivided Assam were his political prowess, superb personality, truthfulness and behaviour which attracted not only his colleagues but also people of various communities. Congress got recognition as a powerful political party in Assam by virtue of his ability and intelligence. His contributions as Chief Minister were mainly to stop Land Tax, stop giving lands to migrant Muslims to secure the right of indigenous people etc.

The new government did not last long as World War II began in 1939. Gopinath Bordoloi's Cabinet resigned in 1940 following an appeal by Mohandas K. Gandhi. He was arrested again in December 1940. However, he was released before completing one year in jail due to ill health. When Quit India movement was launched in August 1942, the Congress party was declared outlawed and all leaders were arrested.

In the meantime, Md. Sadulla formed the government with the promise to help British in World War II and indulged again in communal activities. Gopinath Bordoloi was released from jail in 1944 and he straightaway started opposing the government with the help of other leaders. Md. Sadullah then offered to discuss the matters. An agreement was reached which included immediate release of all political prisoners, removing the ban on procession or meeting, correcting the process of rehabilitation of migrant Muslims, etc.

In July 1945, the British announced their decision to form a new constitution for India after holding the central and regional election. Congress too participated in the election in 1946 and they became the major party in Assembly with 61 seats out of 108. They formed the Government and Gopinath Bordoloi was made Chief Minister unanimously.

Cabinet commission and Bordoloi's role

The British Government formed the Cabinet Mission of 1946 to discuss the demands for Indian Independence. The members held meetings with the Congress and the Muslim League in Shimla and Delhi. Their plan included grouping of states into 3 categories for selecting the candidates to form the constitutional body with Assam and Bengal in third group. Gopinath Bordoloi sensed the ominous sign for Assam in the plan as the inclusion would mean the local representatives will become minority in comparison to Bengal. That would be devastating for rights of people of Assam.

The Assam Pradesh Congress Committee decided to go against the grouping plan. Gopinath Bordoloi told the Indian National Congress working committee, Cabinet committee and the Viceroy that the representatives of Assam will form the Constitution of Assam themselves and will decide whether to join the group or not among themselves. Subsequently, the Cabinet commission announced that the grouping will be mandatory for every state and they may later withdraw from the group if they want. This further complicated the situation. Bordoloi met the Indian National Congress leaders to discuss it with no result. He then, with the Assam Congress Committee, decided to start mass agitation in Assam. Only after this, the Indian National Congress working committee advised them to pass a unanimous decision in Assembly. Later, the members of the Assembly suggested a working formula in which ten representatives from Assam would form their own constitution without joining any group and would merge with national committee to form the Indian constitution.

In 1947, Lord Mountbatten took over as new Viceroy. He held separate meetings with the Muslim League, Congress and Mahatma Gandhi. They decided to go for Partition as a permanent solution instead of grouping. India and Pakistan became separate independent countries.

Thus, Gopinath Bordoloi played a major role in securing the future of Assam which would have been included in East Pakistan otherwise.

Contribution as Chief Minister
After India's Independence, he worked closely with Sardar Vallabhbhai Patel to secure the sovereignty of Assam against China on one hand and Pakistan on the other. He also helped to organise the rehabilitation of millions of Hindu refugees who had fled East Pakistan due to widespread violence and intimidation in the aftermath of Partition. His work formed the basis for ensuring communal harmony, democracy and stability which effectively kept Assam secure and progressive right up to the 1971 war over Bangladesh's independence. He was instrumental in establishing Gauhati University, High Court of Assam, Assam Medical College, Assam Veterinary College, etc. Gopinath Bordoloi was also a gifted writer. He wrote several books like Annasaktiyog, Shreeramachandra, Hajrat Mohammad, and Budhhadeb while in jail. Throughout his life, he was a stern believer in Gandhian principles. He led a simple life in spite of being a Chief Minister. He died on 5 August 1950.

Awards and recognition
Former Prime Minister Atal Bihari Vajpayee conferred upon him the Bharat Ratna posthumously in 1999. A life-size statue of Bordoloi was unveiled on 1 October 2002 in the Parliament House by the President of India, A.P.J. Abdul Kalam.

References

Bibliography
  Nirode Kumar Barooah: Gopinath Bardoloi, 'The Assam Problem' and Nehru's Centre. Bhabani Books 2010, ISBN 978-9380390536

External links

 http://www.assam.org/node/2363

1890 births
1950 deaths
Scottish Church College alumni
Recipients of the Bharat Ratna
Chief Ministers of Assam
Indian independence activists from Assam
University of Calcutta alumni
Members of the Constituent Assembly of India
People from Nagaon district
Leaders of the Opposition in Assam
Chief ministers from Indian National Congress
Cotton College, Guwahati alumni